The Roman Catholic Diocese of Yendi is a diocese located in the city of Yendi in the Ecclesiastical province of Tamale in Ghana.

History
 March 16, 1999: Established as Diocese of Yendi from the Metropolitan Archdiocese of Tamale

Special churches
The Cathedral is the Cathedral of Our Lady of Lourdes in Yendi.

Leadership
 Bishops of Yendi (Roman rite)
 Bishop Vincent Sowah Boi-Nai, S.V.D. (1999- 2022)
 Bishop Matthew Yitiereh (2022-present)

See also
Roman Catholicism in Ghana

Sources
 GCatholic.org
 Catholic Hierarchy

Roman Catholic dioceses in Ghana
Dioceses in Ghana
Christian organizations established in 1999
Roman Catholic dioceses and prelatures established in the 20th century
1999 establishments in Ghana
Roman Catholic Ecclesiastical Province of Tamale